Shahjahanpur may refer to:

Bangladesh 
 Shajahanpur Upazila

India 
 Shahjahanpur, Uttar Pradesh
 Shahjahanpur (Assembly constituency)
 Shahjahanpur (Lok Sabha constituency)
 Shahjahanpur railway station
 Shahjahanpur district, Uttar Pradesh
 Shahjahanpur, Meerut, Uttar Pradesh
 Shahjahanpur Village, Neemrana, Ragasthan